Mohammed Aminu  (born 10 August 2000) is a Ghanaian professional footballer player of forward.

Club career
Aminu was first spotted at the 2017 Al Kass Tournament, while representing Red Bull Salzburg, the parent of his club WAFA. After being scouted by the likes of Real Madrid and Bayern Munich, Aminu agreed a deal to join English champions Manchester City in 2017.

In April 2018, after scoring three goals in four games, Aminu was named Ghanaian Premier League Player of the Month.

In October 2020, Aminu and teammate Thomas Agyepong joined Belgian First Division B side Lommel S.K. on loan until the end of the 2020–21 season. Like his parent club, Lommel are owned by City Football Group.

Career statistics

Club

Notes

References

2000 births
Living people
Ghanaian footballers
Ghanaian expatriate footballers
Association football forwards
Ghana Premier League players
Manchester City F.C. players
NAC Breda players
FC Dordrecht players
Lommel S.K. players
Ghanaian expatriate sportspeople in England
Expatriate footballers in England
Ghanaian expatriate sportspeople in the Netherlands
Expatriate footballers in the Netherlands
Ghanaian expatriate sportspeople in Belgium
Expatriate footballers in Belgium
Ghana youth international footballers